Peace Bridge is a bridge built in 1958 in the city centre of Ulan Bator, Mongolia, with technical and financial assistance from China.

Due to lack of maintenance over the years, the bridge became unsafe for use. In May 2006, the bridge was to undergo a complete overhaul that would take five months. The cost of the overhaul, approximately RMB 19 million, was to be provided by China. As of 2012 the bridge was in operation.

References

Buildings and structures in Ulaanbaatar
Bridges completed in 1963
China–Mongolia relations